The term vaka may refer to:

"Vaka" (song), released as untitled #1 (a.k.a. "Vaka"), a single from the Sigur Rós album ( )
Vaka (sailing), the main hull of a multihull vessel such as a proa or trimaran
 Váka, the Hungarian name for Crişan village, Ribița Commune, Hunedoara County, Romania
Vaka, solo project for Daniel Lidén
Joseph Wilson Vaka (born 1980), Tongan rugby union player

See also
 Vaca (disambiguation)